2006 Season is first year of new franchise Jeju

Jeju United FC season 2006 statistics

{|class="wikitable"
|-bgcolor="#efefef"
! Season
! K-League
! Played
! W
! D
! L
! F
! A
! PTS
! K-League Cup
! FA Cup
! Manager
|-
|2006
|align=right|13th
|align=right|26
|align=right|5
|align=right|10
|align=right|11
|align=right|23
|align=right|30
|align=right|25
|align=right|8th
|align=right|Round of 32
|Jung Hae-Seong
|-
|}

Jeju United FC seasons
South Korean football clubs 2006 season